Scolecenchelys erythraeensis is an eel in the family Ophichthidae (worm/snake eels). It was described by Marie-Louise Bauchot and André L. Maugé in 1980, originally under the genus Muraenichthys. It is a marine, tropical eel which is known from the western Indian Ocean.

References

Taxa named by André L. Maugé
Taxa named by Marie-Louise Bauchot
Fish described in 1980
erythraeensis